The 1939 USSR Chess Championship was the 11th edition of USSR Chess Championship. Held from 15 April to 16 May 1939 in Leningrad. The tournament was won by Mikhail Botvinnik. Semifinals took place in Moscow, Leningrad and  Kiev. Alexander Kotov, author of the classic book Think Like a Grandmaster, made his debut, achieving the runner-up. Former champion of the 1920s Peter Romanovsky returned to compete, but finishing in last place. The level and popularity of chess was skyrocketing in the Soviet Union, the final round, which featured the duel between Botvinnik and Kotov, sold out all the thousands of tickets available to the public.

Table and results

References 

USSR Chess Championships
Championship
Chess
1939 in chess
Chess